Khodadad Mirza Farman Farmaian (8 May 1928 – 16 December 2015) was the son of the Qajar Persian nobleman Abdol Hossein Mirza Farmanfarma and his wife Hamdam Khanoum. During the Pahlavi dynasty era, he held the post of governor of the Central Bank of Iran.

He was the chief architect of the 1960s Iranian economic boom. However, he often dismissed the Shah as incompetent. He fled during the 1979 revolution in Iran to London.

He died of lung cancer at the age of 87 in London, United Kingdom, on 16 December 2015.

See also
 Iran
 History of Iran
 Qajar dynasty of Iran

References

External links 
The Qajar (Kadjar) Pages
Qajars Dynasty Turkoman dynasty of Shahs of Iran

Sources
Daughter of Persia; Sattareh Farman Farmaian with Dona Munker; Crown Publishers,Inc.,New York,1992
 Blood and Oil: Memoirs of a Persian Prince; Manucher Mirza Farman Farmaian. Random House, New York, 1997.

Qajar princes
1928 births
2015 deaths
Exiles of the Iranian Revolution in the United Kingdom
Iranian emigrants to the United Kingdom
Governors of the Central Bank of Iran
Farmanfarmaian family